The church of  Sant'Egidio is located in the historic center of Mantua on Via Pietro Frattini. A church was located on the site likely by the 9th century, but is documented from the year 1151 in a bull by Pope Eugenius III . In 1540, the chapel of the Valenti was built, commissioned by the last will of Valente Valenti, courtier in the Gonzaga Duchy. Beginning in 1721, the church underwent a major reconstruction, and the present facade dates to that time. In 1777, the cardinal Luigi Valenti reconstructed the family chapel.

The interior, mainly the semicircular apse, contains the following canvases:
 Martyrdom of St Vincenzo Levita (1776), by Giuseppe Bottani
 Martyrdom of St Vincenzo Ferrer (1773), by Giovanni Bottani, brother of the above
  Madonna of the Rosary (1777), by Vincenzo Borroni
 Altarpiece of Charity of St Guerrino (1736-1742) by Giovanni Cadioli
 Altarpiece of Madonna, Child, St Dominic  and the Blessed Osanna Andreasi, (1593), attributed to Teodoro Ghisi

Egidio
Egidio
Baroque architecture in Lombardy